The Ministry of Livestock and Rural Community Development was a cabinet ministry in the Government of Sri Lanka.

List of ministers 

Parties

References

External links 
 Ministry of Livestock and Rural Community Development
 Government of Sri Lanka

Livestock and Rural Community Development